Pseudobombax ellipticum, with common names including shaving brush tree, Dr Seuss tree, and amapolla tree, is a species of plant in the subfamily Bombacoideae of the family Malvaceae.

Distribution
The tree is native to southern Mexico, El Salvador, Guatemala, Hispaniola, Honduras and Cuba.

Description
Pseudobombax elipticum is a tree that can reach 18 m (60 ft) in height and 1.3 m (4 ft) d.b.h. Its branches are close to the base of the stem. It is a deciduous tree with succulent stems.  Each of the flowers can produce hundreds of tiny black seeds (.1mm) that germinate within approximately 30 days.

The flowers are fragrant and if peeled back quite sticky.

Uses
Uses include firewood and wood for carving handicrafts.

The attractive flowers are used to decorate homes and churches in Central America. In Central America, a highly intoxicating drink is made from the tree.

Cultivation
The tree is grown as an ornamental tree in Florida, Hawaii, and coastal Southern California.

Gallery

References

ellipticum
Trees of El Salvador
Trees of Honduras
Trees of Guatemala
Trees of Mexico
Garden plants of North America
Caudiciform plants